Manono is a town and territory in Tanganyika Province, Democratic Republic of the Congo.

History
Manono was seriously affected by the Second Congo War (1998-2003), with many buildings destroyed. Rally for Congolese Democracy rebels and allied Rwandan soldiers took control of Manono in 1999. A hydro-electric power plant used to provide electricity, and the town used to have a brewery, which supplied the surrounding region; both were destroyed during the war.

The UN carried out arms decommissioning in 2008, offering to accept guns in exchange for a bicycle. The scheme was successful in removing weapons. Manono later became affected by the Katanga insurgency; by 2014/15, Gédéon Kyungu Mutanga, the leader of the Mai Mai Kata Katanga rebel group, operated in the area before relocating. Elements of his group continued to hold out in Manono Territory. In November 2021, three commanders and 169 Mai Mai Bakata Katanga militants surrendered to the government in Manono's Mpyana sector.

Location, economy, and culture 
Manono lies on the western bank of the Lukushi River, a tributary of the Luvua River. The town is a river port, with barges bringing cargo from Lubumbashi. Manono is also connected to a disused railway line to Muyumba. The town lies along National Road 33 (N33) and Regional Road 628 (R628).

Economic activity is centered on mining, with the surrounding area containing approximately 100 million tonnes of minerals, including spodumene (lithium), columbite, tin and tantalite. Mining by Géomines began in 1915. The Manono-Kitolo mine was worked almost continuously until the late 1970s, first by Géomines and later by Congo-Etain and Zairetain. Perhaps 180,000 tonnes of cassiterite ore were extracted in this period.

The collapse of the world tin price in the 1980s severely hit the town's economy. However, since 2017 exploration has been underway for lithium minerals and tin at the historical tin mine in the Manono - Kitotolo region.

The town is served by Manono Airport. Manono has a cathedral which was built by Belgian missionaries, and was severely damaged during the war.

Climate
Manono has a tropical savanna climate (Köppen: Aw).

References

Populated places in Tanganyika Province